Conceição de Maria Carvalho de Andrade (born November 19, 1940) is a Brazilian lawyer and politician. She was mayor of São Luís (1993–97) and state deputy (1987–91).

See also
 List of mayors of São Luís, Maranhão

References 

20th-century Brazilian women politicians
Brazilian Labour Party (current) politicians
Brazilian Democratic Movement politicians
Democratic Labour Party (Brazil) politicians
Brazilian Socialist Party politicians
Women mayors of places in Brazil
People from São Luís, Maranhão
Living people
1940 births